Assumpta Escarp i Gibert (born 1957) is a Spanish jurist and Socialists' Party of Catalonia politician, current Second Vicepresident of the Parliament of Catalonia.

Biography 
She studied law at the University of Barcelona and initially militated at the PSUC. She earned a master's degree in public management at ESADE. In 1985 she began to work at a research center at Hospital del Mar. Since then she joined the PSC and linked to the Barcelona City Council.

After participating in the creation of Pompeu Fabra University, in 1991, she worked for the management of the central services of the City Council of Barcelona, and in 1995 she was the head of the then mayor's Deputy Mayor, Joan Clos. When Clos was elected mayor will become head of mayor's office. She will be elected councilor in the municipal elections of 2003, 2007 and 2011. During these years she has been the councilor for Citizen Participation, Solidarity and Cooperation (2003-2006), of Urban Planning (2006-2007), councilor of the district of the Eixample (2006-2010), councilor for prevention, safety and mobility (2007-2010), president of Transports Metropolitans de Barcelona, third Deputy Mayor (2010-2011) and vice president of Environment of the Àrea Metropolitana de Barcelona (2011-2015).

She was elected to the Parliament of Catalonia in the elections of 2015, 2017 and 2021. Since 5 October 2021, Escarp is the second vicepresident of the Parliament, succeeding Eva Granados.

References

1957 births
Living people
Socialists' Party of Catalonia politicians
Spanish Socialist Workers' Party politicians
ESADE alumni
University of Barcelona alumni
Members of the 11th Parliament of Catalonia
Women members of the Parliament of Catalonia
Members of the 12th Parliament of Catalonia
21st-century Spanish women politicians
Members of the Parliament of Catalonia
People from Terrassa
Barcelona municipal councillors